Micropterix rablensis is a species of moth belonging to the family Micropterigidae, which was described by Philipp Christoph Zeller in 1868. It is probably restricted to Carinthia in Austria and to the adjacent areas of Styria in Austria and Italy and potentially of Slovenia. Its Croatian, Romanian and French existence is doubtful.

Adults have been found at outskirts of forest with tall herbaceous vegetation and bushes, congregating on goat's beard (Aruncus dioicus).

References

Micropterigidae
Moths described in 1868
Moths of Europe
Taxa named by Philipp Christoph Zeller